The 2014 American Athletic Conference softball tournament was held at the Cougar Softball Stadium on the campus of the University of Houston in Houston, Texas, from May 8 through May 11, 2014. The tournament determined the champion of the American Athletic Conference for the 2014 NCAA Division I softball season.   won the tournament and earned the American Athletic Conference's automatic bid to the 2014 NCAA Division I softball tournament.

Format and seeding
The conference's 8 teams were seeded based on conference winning percentage based on the round-robin regular season.  They then played a single elimination tournament.

Results

Bracket

Game results

All-Tournament Team
The following players were named to the All-Tournament Team.

Most Outstanding Player
Katie Keller was named Most Outstanding Player.  Keller was 5 for 5 with three home runs, including a grand slam, in the tournament.

References

Tournament
American Athletic Conference softball tournament